James Patrick Holmes (born August 3, 1940 in Durant, Oklahoma) is a former gridiron football defensive lineman who played in the Canadian Football League (CFL), the American Football League (AFL), and the National Football League (NFL). 

Although selected by the Philadelphia Eagles of the NFL in 1962 NFL Draft, Holmes began his professional career in CFL. He played for the Calgary Stampeders from 1962–1965. 

Holmes then played for the Houston Oilers in the AFL from 1966–1969. He was an AFL All-Star in 1967 and 1968. After the AFL–NFL merger in 1970, Holmes remained with the Oilers until 1972. Holmes played his last season with the 1973 Kansas City Chiefs.

See also
Other American Football League players

1940 births
Living people
American football defensive linemen
Texas Tech Red Raiders football players
American players of Canadian football
Canadian football defensive linemen
Calgary Stampeders players
American Football League All-Star players
Houston Oilers players
Kansas City Chiefs players
Players of American football from Oklahoma
People from Durant, Oklahoma
American Football League players